Parliamentary TV-channel «RADA» is the official television channel of the Ukrainian parliament (Verkhovna Rada).

Until its relaunch in December 2021, it showed live broadcasts of the parliament's meetings, and others programs related to the law-making process. After December 2021, RADA was a state-owned, 24/7 news and informational TV channel. The channel was created in 1998 and is financed from the state budget.

Controversies 
According to UDAR MP Iryna Herashchenko in December 2013 the channel ignored the pro-European rallies of Euromaidan while broadcasting mostly speeches and statements made by government members and rallies held by Party of Regions (and thus not covering the activities of all parliamentary factions and MPs, including opposition and independent deputies).

CEOs 
 Mykola Orlovskyi (1999 — 2012)
 Vasyl Klymchuk (February 2012 — March 2013)
 Ihor Tolstykh (March 2013 — March 2014)
 Vasyl Klymchuk (acting, from March 2014)

See also 

 List of Ukrainian language television channels
 C-SPAN

References

External links
 

Television stations in Ukraine
Legislature broadcasters
Ukrainian brands
Television channels and stations established in 1999
Ukrainian-language television stations in Ukraine
1999 establishments in Ukraine
Government-owned companies of Ukraine